Robert Hammond may refer to:

Literary
 Robert Hammond (writer), American author, film producer and occasional actor
 Robert Hammond (author) (1920–2009), American film critic and professor of French

Political
 Rob Hammond (politician), former mayor of Monrovia, California
 Robert Hanna Hammond (1791–1847), U.S. Congressman from Pennsylvania

Sports
 Robert Hammond (field hockey) (born 1981), Australian Olympic field hockey player
 Bobby Hammond (born 1952), American football running back
 Bob Hammond (1942–2020), Australian rules footballer
 Bob Hammond (footballer, born 1905) (1905–1993), Australian footballer
 Robert Hammond (footballer) (c. 1950–2017), Ghanaian footballer

Other
 Robert Hammond (Roundhead) (1621–1654), British noble and Parliamentary Governor of the Isle of Wight
 Robert Hammond (High Line) (born 1968/69), co-founder and executive director of Friends of the High Line
 Robert C Hammond (sternwheeler), paddle steamer built for service on the upper Fraser and Nechako Rivers in Canada
 Robert R. Hammond, founder of Glastron Boats

Hammond, Robert